Erling Norvik (9 April 1928 – 31 December 1998) was a Norwegian politician from the Conservative Party.

Norvik was born in Vadsø, the son of Erling Johannes Norvik, who served in the Norwegian parliament (Stortinget) from 1949 to 1961.  The younger Norvik started his professional career as a journalist for the regional paper Finnmarken when he was 12 years old and was elected to Stortinget in 1961 from his native county, Finnmark, succeeding his father.

Norvik was seated in the legislature for three successive periods, from 1961 to 1973 and then resigned to become the leader of the Conservative Party, a post he held from 1974–1980 and 1984–1986. He turned down a ministerial post in 1981, choosing instead to work in the prime minister office's of his party colleague Kåre Willoch.

In 1986 he was appointed Governor ("Fylkesmann") of Østfold county, as which he served for 12 years.

References
 

1928 births
1998 deaths
Members of the Storting
County governors of Norway
Finnmark politicians
People from Vadsø
Leaders of the Conservative Party (Norway)
20th-century Norwegian politicians